Dustin Ray Burrows (born November 14, 1978) is an attorney and businessman in Lubbock, Texas, who is a Republican member of the Texas House of Representatives from District 83.  He has represented the 83rd district since January 2015. Burrows is the former Chairman of the House Ways and Means Committee and the former Chair of House Republican Caucus. He has sponsored legislation including the SB2 bill, enabling Texas taxpayers to control local tax rates and tax increases. He also serves as the Chairman of the House Calendars Committee, a position he has held since 2021.

Early life, education, and career 

Burrows graduated from Monterey High School in Lubbock. Burrows is licensed to practice law in New Mexico and Texas and was a partner in the Texas firm McCleskey, Harriger, Brazill, & Graff.

Legislative career

Texas House of Representatives

Nomination and election 

Burrows was nominated by the Terry County Republican Party to run for the Texas House of Representatives in 2014, representing the 83rd District. He won the general election for the position in November 2014, beating Democratic opponent Max R. Tarbox with 81.2 percent of the vote. He was re-elected in 2016, running unopposed.

Re-election, Chair of House Republican Caucus 
He was re-elected to the House for his third legislative session in 2018, defeating Democrat Drew Landry with 77.3 percent of the vote. After the election, Burrows was elected as Chair of the House Republican Caucus, and was appointed to chair the Ways and Means Committee.

In this capacity Burrows authored the HB2 bill, which enables Texas taxpayers to control local tax rates and tax increases. The legislation was partnered with another piece of legislation which dealt with public school finance reform, HB3; that bill provides almost $5 billion in property tax relief and increased the state's share of school funding.

In addition to these bills, Burrows was behind legislation supporting Texas firefighters, an issue he had begun to successfully address during the prior session. During the 86th Session, Burrows co-authored House Bill 1521 – "which would penalize insurers that illegally deny Texas first responders access to medical treatment for line-of-duty injuries covered under state workers’ compensation laws. This proposed legislation would amend Section 415.021 of the Labor Code to add sanctions, administrative penalties, and other remedies, including attorney's fees, for administrative violations by self- or collectively insured municipalities obligated to cover eligible workers’ compensation claims. The amount of the administrative penalty shall not be less than two times the total amount of benefits payable in connection with the first responder employee's claim."

HB 1525 – also authored by Burrows, Flower Mound Republican Senator Jane Nelson and Dallas Democratic Senator Royce West, will enable Texas to collect more than half a billion dollars over the next two years after enforcing the state's sales tax across state lines. Prior to this legislation, the state could only force sellers to collect Texas sales tax if they had a physical location in Texas, putting small businesses at a financial disadvantage.

Burrows was present at a 2019 meeting with Empower Texans CEO Michael Quinn Sullivan and Dennis Bonnen, where Sullivan later accused them of offering press credentials in exchange for targeting moderate Republican members seeking re-election. Burrows resigned as Republican Caucus chairman following the accusation. An investigation by the Texas Rangers ultimately concluded that no laws were broken in the exchange.

Re-election, Chair to the House Calendars Committee 

On August 22, 2019, Burrows announced he would seek re-election and was endorsed by Texas Governor Greg Abbott. He ran unopposed in the 2020 Republican primary and defeated Democrat Addison Perry-Franks in the general election with 79.29 percent of the vote. After the election, Burrows was assigned as the Chair to the House Calendars Committee, overseeing the timeline and order for bills to reach the House floor.

Burrows and Sen. Paul Bettencourt (R-Houston) introduced legislation to reprimand any localities who choose to use a loophole in the State's property tax code. Burrows spearheaded an ultimately successful effort to have gun stores in Texas declared essential businesses, allowing them to choose to open during the State's Covid-19 lockdown. During the regular Session, Burrows supported local political efforts in Lubbock, Texas to outlaw abortion at the local level. After the Dallas Mavericks reportedly stopped playing the National Anthem before games, Burrows supported suspending tax-subsidies for stadiums that stopped playing the anthem.

Personal life
Burrows is married to the former Elisabeth Hause, who grew up in South Texas in a family engaged in cattle ranching and oil and natural gas. They have three sons. The family is evangelical Christian.

References

External links 

 Burrows Law official website

|-

1978 births
21st-century American politicians
Businesspeople from Texas
Christians from Texas
Living people
Republican Party members of the Texas House of Representatives
Monterey High School (Lubbock, Texas) alumni
New Mexico lawyers
People from Lubbock, Texas
Rawls College of Business alumni
Rhodes College alumni
Texas lawyers
Texas Tech University School of Law alumni